The 2015 NBA playoffs was the postseason tournament of the National Basketball Association's 2014–15 season. The tournament concluded with the Western Conference champion Golden State Warriors defeating the Eastern Conference champion Cleveland Cavaliers 4 games to 2 in the NBA Finals. Andre Iguodala was named NBA Finals MVP.

Overview

Western Conference
For the first time since 2005–06, all teams from a particular division made the playoffs (in this case, all five teams from the Southwest Division).

The San Antonio Spurs made their 18th straight playoff appearance, while the Golden State Warriors (third straight playoff appearance) entered the playoffs as the first seed of their respective conferences.

Despite making the Western Conference Finals the previous year and winning 45 games this season, the Oklahoma City Thunder missed the playoffs due to a tie-breaker with the New Orleans Pelicans. The Pelicans themselves made their first playoff appearance since 2011, and their first as The Pelicans.

Eastern Conference
The Atlanta Hawks entered their eighth consecutive postseason (continuing the longest active streak in the Eastern Conference) with the top seed in the Eastern Conference.

The Cleveland Cavaliers made their first postseason appearance since 2010, the final season of LeBron James' first stint with the Cavaliers. On the other hand, James' former team, the Miami Heat, missed the playoffs after making the previous year's Finals, becoming the first team to do so since the 2005 Lakers. Miami had qualified for the playoffs for six consecutive seasons before missing this year, also reaching the NBA Finals four consecutive times. The Heat and their in-state rivals, the Orlando Magic, both missed the playoffs in the same season for the first time since 1993.

Despite making the Eastern Conference Finals last season, the Indiana Pacers failed to make the playoffs by virtue of losing a tie-breaker to the Brooklyn Nets.

Despite starting their respective seasons in a rebuilding mode, both the Milwaukee Bucks and the Boston Celtics returned to the playoffs after a one-year absence. Bucks head coach Jason Kidd became the first head coach to lead two teams to the playoffs in his first two seasons, having led the Nets to the playoffs the previous season.

First Round
The first round of the playoffs saw a record six teams take a 3–0 lead in their respective series, the first time it had happened since the first round expanded to a best-of-seven series in 2003.

The fifth seed defeated the fourth seed in both conferences for the third straight year.

With their first round victory over the Dallas Mavericks, the Houston Rockets won their first playoff series since 2009.

Game 7 between the Clippers and Spurs ensured a 16th straight postseason in which at least one Game 7 was played; 1999 was the last postseason to not feature a Game 7.

The San Antonio Spurs became the first defending champions to be eliminated in the first round since the 2011–12 Dallas Mavericks. This was only the second time it had happened since 2000.

Conference Semifinals
With the Spurs being eliminated in the first round, none of the eight teams remaining at the beginning of the Conference Semifinals had previously won an NBA championship in the 21st century. Entering the Conference Semifinals, of the teams who had previously won an NBA championship, the Chicago Bulls had the shortest drought at 17 years, having most recently won an NBA championship in 1998, while the Atlanta Hawks had the longest overall drought at 57 years, having won their only previous championship in 1958 when the franchise was based in St. Louis.

All teams that held a 2–1 series lead within the first three games of their respective second round series had gone on to lose that series.

The Cavaliers-Bulls series was notable for two game winning baskets by both teams’ star players.
 Game 3: Derrick Rose hitting a wide open three pointer to win the game for the Chicago Bulls.
 Game 4: LeBron James making a catch and shoot two pointer to win the game for the Cleveland Cavaliers.

With their Game 7 win over the Los Angeles Clippers, the Houston Rockets became the ninth team in NBA history to come back from 3–1 series deficits to win the conference semifinals, and only the second franchise to do it twice. They had first achieved that goal 20 years ago against the Phoenix Suns. The Boston Celtics are the only other franchise to twice make this comeback, doing it in 1968 and 1981. Overall, twelve teams have achieved the feat, with the Golden State Warriors doing it in the Western Conference Finals and Cleveland Cavaliers doing it in the NBA Finals the following season. The Denver Nuggets did it twice in 2020.

With their series win over the Chicago Bulls, the Cleveland Cavaliers made the Eastern Conference Finals for the first time since 2009. 

With their series win over the Washington Wizards, the Atlanta Hawks made the Conference Finals (then called the Division Finals) for the first time since 1970. Since 1970, they had lost all 15 Division or Conference Semifinal series they participated in. 

With their series win over the Memphis Grizzlies, the Golden State Warriors made their first conference finals appearance since 1976, while the Houston Rockets made their first conference finals appearance since 1997. The Hawks, Warriors, and Rockets were the three NBA teams which had been waiting for the longest time for a return to the conference finals prior to this postseason.

Conference Finals
For the second straight year, the No. 1 seed faced the No. 2 seed in the Conference Finals, and for the fourth time since 2000.

For the first time in NBA playoff history, both conference finals teams, the Warriors of the West and the Cavaliers of the East, held commanding 3–0 series leads. Cleveland went on to the finals, sweeping the Atlanta Hawks 4–0 to make their first NBA Finals since 2007, while Golden State won their series 4–1 defeating the Houston Rockets en route to their first NBA Finals since 1975.

NBA Finals
For the first time since the inaugural Basketball Association of America season in 1946–47, two rookie coaches, David Blatt of the Cavaliers and Steve Kerr of the Warriors, met each other in the NBA finals.

Like the Conference Semifinals, the team that took a 2-1 series lead (the Cleveland Cavaliers), went on to lose the series.

The Golden State Warriors won their first championship since 1975. Andre Iguodala was named NBA Finals MVP despite not starting in a game until the NBA Finals.

Format

Within each conference, the three division winners and the five non-division winners with the most wins qualified for the playoffs. The seedings are based on each team's record; however, a division winner is guaranteed to be ranked at least fourth, regardless of record.

Each conference's bracket is fixed; there is no reseeding. All rounds are best-of-seven series; the team that has four wins advances to the next round. As stated above, all rounds, including the NBA Finals, are in a 2–2–1–1–1 format. Home court advantage in any round does not necessarily belong to the higher-seeded team, but instead to the team with the better regular season record. If two teams with the same record meet in a round, standard tiebreaker rules are used. The rule for determining home court advantage in the NBA Finals is winning percentage, then head-to-head record, followed by record vs. opposite conference.

Tiebreaker rules
The tiebreakers that determine seedings are:

 Division leader wins tie from team not leading a division
 Head-to-head record
 Division record (if all the tied teams are in the same division)
 Conference record
 Record vs. playoff teams, own conference
 Record vs. playoff teams, other conference (only in two-way tie)
 Point differential, all games

If there are more than two teams tied, the team that wins the tiebreaker gets the highest seed, while the other teams were "re-broken" from the first step until all ties were resolved. Since the three division winners were guaranteed a spot in the top four, ties to determine the division winners had to be broken before any other ties.

Possible future changes
As the 2014–15 regular season proceeded into February 2015, the ninth-place team in the Western Conference had a better record than the eighth-place team in the East. This led NBA Commissioner Adam Silver to suggest changing the playoff format, where the top 16 teams throughout the entire league would qualify, regardless of division or conference. Silver then stated that the league might not be able to implement such changes until the 2016–17 season at the earliest.

Playoff qualifying
On March 3, the Atlanta Hawks became the first team to clinch a playoff spot. This was the earliest a team had clinched a playoff spot since the 1995–96 Chicago Bulls clinched on March 2. The Golden State Warriors became the first Western Conference team to clinch a playoff spot on March 16.

Bracket

Notes
Memphis had home court advantage in the first round despite not being a higher seed as they had a better regular season record than their opponent, but did not have the best record of the non-division-champion playoff teams in the West. This rule was changed as a result of this season's playoffs. The southwest division, which the Grizzlies are a part of, also had all five teams make the playoffs this year. This had only happened 3 times before.

First round
All times are in Eastern Daylight Time (UTC−4)

Eastern Conference first round

(1) Atlanta Hawks vs. (8) Brooklyn Nets

This was the first meeting in the playoffs between the Hawks and Nets.

(2) Cleveland Cavaliers vs. (7) Boston Celtics

(3) Chicago Bulls vs. (6) Milwaukee Bucks

During the final minute of the game, Derrick Rose drove inside then passed to Pau Gasol who laid it in as he was fouled. Gasol would then make the free throw and tie the game at 90. Then, when Rose tried to win the series for Chicago, he crossed but then was stripped by Khris Middleton. He then attempted a half court shot, which was blocked by Jimmy Butler when timeout was called. With 1.3 seconds left, Jared Dudley found the lead pass for Jerryd Bayless, due to a defensive breakdown by Rose, who then hit the game-winning lay-up at the buzzer, allowing the Bucks to stave off elimination for at least one more game.

This was the fourth playoff meeting between these two teams, with the Bucks winning two out of the first three meeting.

(4) Toronto Raptors vs. (5) Washington Wizards

This was the first meeting in the playoffs between the Raptors and Wizards.

Western Conference first round

(1) Golden State Warriors vs. (8) New Orleans Pelicans

After Anthony Davis split a pair of free throws, Curry missed an attempted game-tying three, but Marreese Speights grabbed the offensive rebound and Curry hit another three to tie the game at 108. The Warriors would win in OT.

This was the first meeting in the playoffs between the Warriors and Pelicans.

(2) Houston Rockets vs. (7) Dallas Mavericks

This was the third playoff meeting between these two teams, with the Mavericks winning both previous meetings.

(3) Los Angeles Clippers vs. (6) San Antonio Spurs

In Game 1, the Clippers had a dominant game. It was close in the first half, but the Clippers pulled away in the second half. Chris Paul scored 32 points, while Blake Griffin scored 27 points. This helped the Clippers win 107–92.

Game 2 was much closer, requiring overtime. The Spurs won 111–107 in the Staples Center, tying the series 1–1, lead by Tim Duncan's 27 points.

In Game 3, the Spurs completely controlled the offense, and never trailed. They won 100–73 with Kawhi Leonard scoring 32 points. In Game 4, the Clippers won 114–105. Chris Paul scored 34 points and 7 assists.

It was a tight game in Game 5 in the Staples Center, especially in the 4th quarter. At the end of the game, DeAndre Jordan tipped the ball in; however, the refs called goaltending. The Spurs prevailed 111–107, lead by Tim Duncan's 24 points and 11 rebounds.

In Game 6, Spurs Tim Duncan, Manu Ginóbili, Tony Parker, Kawhi Leonard along with Clippers Chris Paul and Blake Griffin struggled offensively. The Spurs gave up a 10-point lead, allowing the Clippers to win 102–96.

Game 7 was a very tight game, featuring 31 lead changes and 19 ties. In the first half, Chris Paul injured his hamstring, but returned in the third quarter, concluding that quarter with a buzzer beater 3-pointer, giving them a 79–78 lead. The fourth quarter was a nail-biter, with the Spurs leading in the beginning and the Clippers at the end. With 1 second left in the game, Chris Paul hit the game winner, and the Clippers moved on to the second round by a meager two-point margin. The final score was 111–109.

This was the second playoff meeting between these two teams, with the Spurs winning the only meeting.

(4) Portland Trail Blazers vs. (5) Memphis Grizzlies

This was the first meeting in the playoffs between the Blazers and Grizzlies.

Conference semifinals

Eastern Conference semifinals

(1) Atlanta Hawks vs. (5) Washington Wizards 

 
The Hawks rallied from a 19-point deficit heading into the final period to tie the score at 101 with a basket. On the ensuing possession, Paul Pierce, who was double-teamed, hit a fadeaway jumper off the backboard at the buzzer to give the Wizards a 103–101 victory and a 2–1 lead in the series. After the game, when ESPN analyst Chris Broussard asked Pierce if he called bank on that shot, he responded, "I called game!"

With 8.3 seconds left, Kyle Korver inbounded the ball to Dennis Schroder, who drives for the layup that was blocked by John Wall, then Al Horford gets the offensive rebound and hits the game-winning layup with 1.9 seconds left. John Wall then misses the half-court buzzer beater, and the Hawks take the 3–2 series lead.

The Hawks were up by 3, with 6.4 seconds to go. Bradley Beal's inbound pass went to John Wall, who tried to get open with time running down, then he passed to Paul Pierce who hit an off-balanced game-tying 3. But when officials reviewed the play, the clock reached 0:00 before Pierce released the ball and therefore the shot did not count. The Hawks won the series and advanced to the Eastern Conference Finals for the first time since 1970.

This was the fifth playoff meeting between these two teams, with the Wizards (formerly known as the Bullets) winning three out of the first four meetings.

(2) Cleveland Cavaliers vs. (3) Chicago Bulls

The Bulls led wire to wire to go up 1–0 in the series, leading by as many as 16 points in the second quarter. The Cavs rallied to tie the game early in the third quarter. However, the Bulls went on a 15–0 run in the third quarter to regain control before holding off the Cavs late in the 4th quarter. 

Facing the possibility of going down 2–0 heading to Chicago, the Cavaliers blew out the Bulls in Game 2, leading wire to wire as they evened the series 1–1. The Cavs outscored the Bulls by 20 points in the first quarter and never looked back. The Bulls got no closer than 11 for the rest of the game. LeBron led the Cavs with 33 points on 13/29 shooting while Irving chipped in 21 points. 

J.R. Smith returned to the lineup after missing the first two games due to suspension. This was a very competitive game that saw neither team lead by more than 8 points. Trailing 94–93, LeBron James missed a go-ahead layup with under 24 seconds to play. Taj Gibson was fouled and made two free throws to make it 96–93 Bulls. James found Smith, who hit the game tying three to make it 96–96. The Bulls called timeout on their final possession of regulation. Rose shot a deep three that went off the backboard and into the basket, giving the Bulls a 99–96 win and a 2–1 series lead. Rose led the Bulls with 30 points. LeBron led the Cavs with 27, but he continued to struggle with his shot and Jimmy Butler's defense, going 8/25 for the game and 1/7 on threes.

Looking to go up 3–1 and take complete control of the series, the Bulls went up 37–29 early in the second quarter. However, the Cavs scored 16 unanswered points to go up 45–37 before settling for a 49–45 halftime lead. The Bulls dominated the third quarter, outscoring the Cavs 23–12. They led by as many as 11 points before settling for a 68–61 lead heading into the 4th quarter. Led by J.R. Smith and Timofey Mozgov, the Cavs would rally, opening the 4th quarter on a 19–5 run to take an 80–73 lead with just under 5 minutes to play. With just under 40 seconds to play, LeBron hit two consecutive free throws to put the Cavs up 84–79. Butler hit a three on the Bulls' next possession, cutting the deficit to 84–82. The Cavs were forced to burn three consecutive timeouts as they were unable to inbound the ball. Once they inbounded the ball, James tried to burn the clock down as he was double teamed by Rose and Dunleavy. However, James swung his arm at Dunleavy and committed an offensive foul, giving the ball back to the Bulls with 14 seconds remaining. Rose tied the game with a layup to even the game at 84–84 with 8 seconds remaining. James rushed down the court and tried to score the go-ahead layup but was blocked. The ball went out of bounds with 1.5 seconds remaining. On the Cavs' final possession, Matthew Dellavedova inbounded the ball to James. James fired a jumper over Butler that went through the hoop as the buzzer sounded, giving the Cavs an 86–84 win. The Cavs regained homecourt advantage as they evened up the series at 2–2. James led the team with 25 points (10/30 shooting) while Rose led the Bulls with 31 points on 11/23 shooting. 
 
This game was particularly controversial due to a timeout that wasn't called late in the game. After Rose made the layup to tie the game at 84–84, Cavaliers head coach, David Blatt, attempted to call timeout. However, the Cavs were out of timeouts. Calling a timeout without having one would have resulted in a technical foul and possession of the ball would go to the Bulls. Tyron Lue held back Blatt and prevented him from getting that timeout. None of the officials noticed Blatt signaling timeout as James ran up the court for what would eventually lead to his game winning buzzer beater.

Following the game, the NBA officiating report revealed that Blatt should have been charged with a timeout that would have drawn a technical and Cavs turnover.

 
The Bulls scored the first 8 points of the contest and led 18–8 early in the first quarter. However, the Cavs closed the first quarter on a 17–6 run to take a 25–24 lead into the 2nd quarter. The Cavs' momentum carried over into the 2nd quarter as they built a 54–44 halftime lead. James, who had struggled mightily with his shooting throughout the series, scored 24 points on 10/12 shooting in the first half. The Cavaliers controlled the third quarter and led by 9 after three quarters. Early in the 4th quarter, Dellavedova fell down, and Gibson's legs got tangled up with his. Gibson, attempting to break free, kicked Dellavedova. Gibson was charged with a flagrant 2 and ejected. The Cavs went up by as many as 17 points in the 4th quarter and led 97–82 with just over 6 minutes to play. However, the Bulls would rally, going on a 17–4 run to make it 101–99 Cavs with just over one minute to play. Trailing by 2, Butler attempted a three that would have given the Bulls to lead. However, he missed. James ran the clock down and missed a shot on the Cavs' next possession. However, Shumpert grabbed the offensive rebound. With 20 seconds remaining, and trailing by 2, the Bulls were forced to foul. However, the Cavs made their free throws and closed the game out, winning 106–101 and taking a 3–2 series lead. James led the Cavaliers with 38 points and 12 rebounds to go along with 6 assists and 0 turnovers. Butler led the Bulls with 29 points. Rose scored 12 points in the first quarter on 5/9 shooting. He had only 5 points on 2/15 shooting in the final three quarters, including 0 made baskets in the second half. 

After three consecutive contests came down to the final minute, the Cavaliers finally finished off the Bulls, eliminating them 94–73 at the United Center to win the series 4–2. The Bulls led 40–38 halfway through the second quarter. However, the Cavs closed the half on a 20–4 run, leading by 14 at halftime. The Cavs never relinquished control, leading by double digits for the entire second half and going up by as many as 27 points in the 4th quarter. Irving was forced out of the game after suffering an injury in the second quarter. However, Dellavedova led the way, scoring a playoff career high and season high 19 points to lead the Cavaliers. James had 15–9–11, one rebound shy of a triple double. Butler led the Bulls with 20 points. The Bulls scored 31 points in the 1st quarter. However, they were held to 42 points in the final three quarters, including 29 in the second half.

It was the 4th time in the last 6 seasons that the Bulls were eliminated by a team with LeBron James on its roster.

This was the seventh playoff meeting between these two teams, with the Bulls winning five out of the first six meetings.

Western Conference semifinals

(1) Golden State Warriors vs. (5) Memphis Grizzlies

This was the first meeting in the playoffs between the Warriors and Grizzlies.

(2) Houston Rockets vs. (3) Los Angeles Clippers

The Rockets recovered from a 3–1 deficit for the first time since 1995. Game 6 was one for the books as the Rockets overcome a 19–point deficit, going on an incredible 49–18 run including a 40-15 run in the 4th quarter to end the game. The Clippers missed 14 straight shots as Josh Smith and Corey Brewer dominated much of the 4th quarter combining for 29 points. The 4th quarter spark led Houston to a decisive Game 7, and they completed one of the greatest comebacks in NBA playoff history.  This was the ninth time in NBA history a team has come back from a 3–1 deficit to win a series.

The Clippers would ultimately suffer the same fate in 2020, in which they relinquished a 19-point lead in Game 6, and eventually blew a 3–1 series lead to the lower-seeded Denver Nuggets. 

This was the second playoff meeting between these two teams, with the Rockets winning the only previous meeting.

Conference finals

Eastern Conference finals

(1) Atlanta Hawks vs. (2) Cleveland Cavaliers
 
The Cavaliers defeated the Hawks 97–89, stealing homecourt advantage and taking a 1–0 series lead. LeBron led the team with 31 points while J.R. Smith chipped in 28 points, going 8/12 on threes and setting a Cavaliers franchise record for made threes in a playoff game. The game was tied 63–63 in the 3rd quarter. However, the Cavs, led by Smith's hot shooting, went on a 22–4 run (including an 11–0 run to start the fourth quarter) as they went up 85–67 and seized control. The Hawks would attempt to mount a rally, cutting an 18-point deficit down to 4 with under 50 seconds remaining. However, James drove through the lane and made a dunk to put the Cavs up 6. After Paul Millsap missed a three that would have made it a one possession game with 23 seconds remaining, the Cavs made their free throws to close it out.
 
With Irving sitting out due to injury, the Hawks were in a great position to even up the series. However, the Cavaliers blew out the Hawks and took a commanding 2–0 series lead, winning 94–82. The Cavs led 54–49 at halftime. Coming out of halftime, the Cavs seized control, outscoring the Hawks 30–17 in the third quarter, leading by as many as 20 before settling for an 84–66 lead heading into the 4th quarter. The Cavs scored only 10 points in the final period, but the Hawks trailed by double digits for the entire quarter and failed to make a significant run, managing 16 points. LeBron James led the way for the Cavs, scoring 30 points while having 11 assists and 9 rebounds. Dennis Schroder led the Hawks in scoring with 13 points off the bench. It was the first time this season that the Hawks had lost consecutive home games. The game was memorable when Hawks' 3-point specialist Kyle Korver sprained his right ankle after the Cavs' Matthew Dellavedova fell on his right leg while attempting to dive for a loose ball. This injury kept Korver out for the rest of the postseason and would require surgery in the off-season along with an injured elbow that bothered him for most of the season.

In a pivotal Game 3, LeBron James got off to an awful start, going 0/9 in the first quarter as the Hawks led 24–21. Near the end of the second quarter, Al Horford and Matthew Dellavedova got tangled up on the floor. Horford, who had scored 15 points on 7/10 shooting in the first half, swung his elbow at Dellavedova. He received a Flagrant 2 foul and was ejected. The Hawks led 49–48 at halftime. However, the Cavs would dominate the third quarter again, outscoring the Hawks 33–27 to take a 5-point lead into the 4th quarter. The Cavs led by as many 10 in the 4th quarter, leading 88–78. However, the Hawks, led by Jeff Teague, would go on a 26–12 run, taking a four-point lead with just under 1:45 to play. The Cavs scored the final four points of regulation to tie up the game. The Hawks had the final possession of regulation. However, Teague's potential game winning three missed at the buzzer, and the game went into overtime. With just under one minute to play in overtime, the Hawks trailed 109–108. Teague hit a three pointer over Thompson to put the Hawks up 111–109. On the Cavs' next possession, James attempted a jumper that rimmed out. However, Thompson grabbed the offensive rebound and passed it back to James. James went behind the three point line and shot a three that went down, putting the Cavs back ahead 112–111. Out of the timeout, the Hawks turned it over on their next possession. On the Cavs' next possession, James ran the shot clock down before driving into the paint and making a layup to put the Cavs up 114–111. The Hawks had two chances to tie the game and potentially force a second overtime, but Shelvin Mack missed both game tying three point attempts, sending the Hawks to their third straight loss as the Cavs went up 3–0 in the series. James recorded his 51st career triple-double (12th of the postseason) with 37 points, 18 rebounds, and 13 assists. Teague led the Hawks with 30 points. 

After missing the last two games against the Hawks, Irving made his return to the lineup.
The Cavaliers routed the Hawks by 30 points, dominating from start to finish. The Cavs led 32–20 after the first quarter and never looked back. After leading by 17 at halftime, the Cavs controlled the entire second half. The Cavs led 85–60 heading into the fourth quarter, a quarter where very few starters logged minutes. The Cavaliers went on to win 118–88 as the franchise clinched their second Eastern Conference Championship in franchise history and returned to the Finals for the first time since 2007. The Atlanta Hawks became the first #1 seed to be swept in the Conference Finals since the Nets swept the Pistons in the 2003 Conference Finals. LeBron James and James Jones also became the first non-Celtics to appear in five consecutive NBA Finals series.

This was the second playoff meeting between these two teams, with the Cavaliers winning the only prior meeting.

Western Conference finals

(1) Golden State Warriors vs. (2) Houston Rockets

In Game 5, James Harden set an NBA playoff record for turnovers, with 12. The record was previously held by John Williamson of the New Jersey Nets with 11 in 1979.

This was the first meeting in the playoffs between the Warriors and Rockets.

NBA Finals: (W1) Golden State Warriors vs. (E2) Cleveland Cavaliers

This was the first meeting in the NBA Finals between the Warriors and Cavaliers.

Statistical leaders

Media coverage

Television
ESPN, TNT, ABC, ESPN2 and NBA TV broadcast the NBA Playoffs nationally. In the first round the regional sports networks affiliated with the teams can also broadcast the games. Throughout the first two rounds, TNT televises games Saturday through Thursday, ESPN televises games on Friday and Sunday, and ABC televises select games on Saturday and Sunday, usually in the afternoon. NBA TV and ESPN2 televises select games in the first round. TNT televises the Eastern Conference Finals and ESPN the Western Conference Finals. ABC televises the NBA Finals for the 13th consecutive year.

Radio

ESPN Radio has exclusive national radio rights to broadcast the playoffs in the United States. They broadcast mostly ABC games during the first two rounds, all of the conference finals, and the NBA Finals.

References

External links

Basketball – Reference.com's 2015 Playoffs section

Playoffs
National Basketball Association playoffs
ABS-CBN television specials